The siege of Neamț Citadel in 1476 was an important event in the history of Moldavia.

Neamț Citadel was a fortress rumored to have been built in the thirteenth century by the Teutonic Knights, in defence against Tatar incursions.

In 1476, after defeating the Moldavian armies in the Battle of Valea Albă, the Ottoman Empire Sultan Mehmet II forced the Moldavian voivode Ștefan cel Mare to retreat to Cetatea Neamţului. However, as legend says, his mother refused to let him enter the stronghold, and instead advised him to go north into what is now Bukovina and gather a new army. While Ștefan was in Bukovina gathering more forces, Mehmet II laid siege to Neamț Citadel. He positioned his cannons on a nearby hill, and began bombarding the stronghold, causing much damage. The Moldavian garrison was at the point of surrender, when a German prisoner held in the dungeons had the idea of using the cannons against the Ottoman position on the hill. His idea was put into practice, and soon the camp of the Turks was being bombarded, forcing Mehmet II to leave the area. The event is recorded by the late Moldavian chronicle of Ion Neculce.

Siege of John III Sobieski
A historical but romanticized event would have taken place probably during the early years Dimitrie Cantemir's rule in Moldavia, during the latter part of the 17th century and early 18th century. The story is as following: on their way back after raiding Moldavia, the 25,000 men-strong army of Polish king John III Sobieski came across Neamț Citadel, defended by less than 20 men. The Poles attacked the stronghold, believing that it contained necessary provisions. After over a week of siege, the small Moldavian garrison surrendered. Legend has it that, moved by the determined opposition from such a minuscule force, the Polish monarch granted life and free passage to the Moldavians in the garrison and gave them ranks in the Polish army.

Although a few historians contest the authenticity of this legendary siege, it nevertheless had a very important place in 19th century Romanian consciousness, finding its most popular version in Costache Negruzzi's novelette called Sobieski și românii (Sobieski and the Romanians: the title in itself indicates his attitude towards the events described), but also in the poem Cetatea Neamțului by George Coșbuc.

Notes

1476 in Europe
Neamt Citadel
Neamt Citadel
Military history of Romania
History of Western Moldavia
Conflicts in 1476
Neamt
1476 in the Ottoman Empire